Chocamán is a settlement in Veracruz, Mexico. It is located about 146 km south of the Veracruz state capital Xalapa. It has an area of 41.13 km2.

The municipality of Chocamán is delimited to the north and north-east by Coscomatepec, to the north-east and south by Fortín de las Flores, to the south-west by La Perla.

It produces principally maize, beans, Sugarcane and Coffee.

A celebration in honor of Santa Cruz in May.

The weather in  Chocamán  is cold all year with rains in summer.

References

External links 

  Municipal Official webpage
  Municipal Official Information

Municipalities of Veracruz